Otyken (Russian: Отукен) is a Siberian indigenous music group that mixes elements of modern pop with local folk music, incorporating traditional instruments, lyrics, and languages. 'Otyken' is a Chulym word for a sacred land where warriors would lay down their arms and talk. The band was formed in 2015 by Andrey Medonos, and their debut album was released in 2018. As of January 2023, the group has over two million followers on Tiktok, over one hundred and twenty thousand monthly listeners on Spotify, and three hundred thousand subscribers on YouTube. The band members are of Siberian ethnicities and live in tiny villages along the Chulym river in the taiga of Krasnoyarsk Krai.

Genre and style 
The group's career began by performing traditional songs representative of their culture; later, modern elements of rock and pop were blended over this folk foundation to create greater appeal for global audiences. Their homemade costumes also incorporate historic and modern design elements for this same reason. Otyken's music is performed with traditional instruments such as the komuz, igil, jaw harp, rattle, and leather drum, although modern instruments such as the keyboard, bass guitar, and saxophone have been used. Throat singing is also frequently implemented. Many of the group's sounds, both instrumental and vocal, attempt to mimic the sounds of nature and animals, while the lyrics try to capture the practices, beliefs, and spirit of the indigenous people. The language is mostly in Chulym Tatar, which had only 44 speakers in 2010 and about 25 speakers in 2020; some songs are also sung in Khakas or Russian.

Many of their songs tend to consist of a single chord with one bass note playable throughout, often attained through the use of vocal fry throat singing. This is sometimes overlaid with a bass drum on all downbeats, making for a style analogous to trance EDM. This style lends itself to those traditional instruments which are played with fixed pitches, such as the jaw harp, the bass string of the komuz, and some types of throat singing.

History

Formation 
Otyken was formed by its producer, manager, and songwriter, Andrey Medonos, in order to preserve Chulym folklore, traditions, and songs which are nearing extinction. Medonos, though not of Siberian ethnicity, grew up at his family’s apiary in the Siberian wilderness among its indigenous people, who maintained a longstanding beekeeping partnership with the Medonos lineage. There he entered into the beekeeping trade, but also engaged in Chulym culture: hunting, fishing, and foraging with the people and marrying an indigenous woman. He founded The Ethnographic Museum of Honey in Krasnoyarsk city and became its director to preserve the cultures of the Chulym, Tatarlar, Ket, and Selkup indigenous peoples, while also hosting lectures and gatherings. The museum attracted visitors (American Indians in particular) who also wanted to hear the traditional instruments and songs played by indigenous people. This inspired Medonos to find locals who would demonstrate their ethnic music at museum concerts. Medonos’ wife was among the first performers and later went on to create their costumes.

In 2013, Medonos started a YouTube channel to share Chulym culture. There he showcased an apiary made with traditional log beehives and Chulym folklore, dances, and songs that had historically accompanied honey production. In 2015, Otyken was formed and was partnered with Medonos in the production of wild Chulym honey. Their honey products (Ethno-Honey) became popular in Japan and the sales helped to establish the band through funding music production, instruments, equipment, and costumes. They released their first album in 2018. A yurt was constructed at the apiary in the following year to host rehearsals and meetings, and they began holding concerts regularly at the museum.

Recent years 
Otyken performed in numerous international events such as Universiade, the Freestyle Wrestling World Championship, and the Grammy’s Global Spin. Their 2021 album Kykakacha contained more pop and EDM elements, as well as tracks remade with a new lead singer, Azyan. Since album's release, Otyken has begun to gain more traction. They were nominated for a Grammy Award for their song "Legend" in 2022. 

The group has faced some setbacks due to wartime sanctions imposed on Russia by Western nations. In 2022, their Paypal account was blocked and their international sales were limited. Furthermore, Otyken was invited to perform in the FIFA World Cup Qatar 2022 opening ceremony, however they were rejected last minute in October after the European Sports Committee banned Russians from participating. 

The group made plans to perform in the USA in 2023, including on America's Got Talent, however the United States government is preventing them from entering the country.

Members 
Otyken's members are of Chulym, Ket, and Selkup ethnicity – ethnic groups that may be related to the Ainu and to the American Indians. All of the members are local talent from tiny settlements near Pasechnoye village, where medicine and electricity are difficult to access and food is obtained locally through fishing, hunting, foraging, farming, and beekeeping. As a result, the group's members maintain busy lives outside of the band, working in their communities and assisting their families – especially in summer, when concerts come to a halt. Although there are around ten main members in the group, fewer people tend to participate in concerts, depending on each person’s availability. None of the performers were professionally trained in music (with the exception of Ach), however many indigenous Siberians have musical abilities, as it is customary for them to play folk songs and instruments in the home.

Active membership 

 Alena – vocals, drums (2015–2018)
 Kristina – violin (2015–2019)
 Misha – throat singing, guitar, bass guitar, jaw harp, drums, komuz (2017–2019)
 Tsveta (Alina) – jaw harp, drums, komuz, vocals, rattle (2017–present)
 Aisylu (Tansylu) – bass guitar, drums, jaw harp, vocals, rattle (2017–2021)
 Aiko – bass guitar (2018, 2022–present)
 Azyan – vocals (2018, 2021–present)
 Altyna (Altynai) – komuz, vocals, jaw harp (2018–2021)
 Eugene – saxophone, throat singing, jaw harp (2018–2021)
 Taida – vocals (2019–2021)
 Maya (Viktoria) – drums, assistant producer (2019–present)
 Sandro (Sandrosiy) – rattle, throat singing (2020–present)
 Ach – keyboard, throat singing (2020–present)
 Kunchari – igil (2021–present)
 Hakaida – drums (2022–present)
 Otamay – komuz (2022–present)

Discography

Albums 

 Otyken (2018)
 Lord of Honey (2019)
 Kykakacha (2021)
 Phenomenon (2023)

Singles 

 Fashion Day (2020)
 Шаги Шойгу (2021)
 Genesis (2021)
 Legend (2022)
 Storm (2022)

References

External links 

 Official Otyken website
 Andrey Medonos website 
Folk-pop music groups
Russian pop music groups
Russian folk music groups
Krasnoyarsk Krai
Khakassia
Khakas